Bamford may refer to:

Places
Bamford, a village in Derbyshire, England
Bamford, Greater Manchester, a suburb of Rochdale, England
Bamford Edge, an overhang of gritstone in Hope Valley, Derbyshire
Bamford railway station, serves the village of Bamford, Derbyshire

Fictional
Bamford, Cotswolds, a place in Ann Granger's Mitchell & Markby mysteries

Other uses
Bamford (surname)

See also
Balmford
Balmforth